Mar Shimun XVIII Rubil (also Simon XVIII Rouel or Rowil) served as the Catholicos-Patriarch of the Assyrian Church of the East from 1861 to 1903, succeeding his uncle Shimun XVII Abraham.

He led the church from Qodshanis, in southeastern Turkey. In 1869, he received an invitation from the Vatican to attend the First Vatican Council as an observer, but he did not accept the invitation, and he also rejected other initiatives for the union with the Catholic Church. The Catholicos-Patriarch died on March 16, 1903, and was succeeded by Shimun XIX Benyamin.

See also
List of Patriarchs of the Assyrian Church of the East

References

Sources

External links 
 Official site of the Assyrian Church of the East

1903 deaths
Catholicos Patriarchs of the Assyrian Church of the East
Assyrians from the Ottoman Empire
Year of birth missing
19th-century bishops of the Assyrian Church of the East